Çakıroğlu can refer to:

 Çakıroğlu, Azdavay
 Çakıroğlu, Maden

See also 

 Çakıroğlu İsmail Ağa Konağı